Kollárovci (Kollár Brothers) is a Slovak folk group formed in 1997, though their first album was not released until 2006. The group performs Slovak folk songs in the Podhale subdialect, which is a mix of Polish and Slovak. All members alternate between singing and playing instruments. Kollárovci is made up of three Kollár brothers and three other musicians. The group performs mostly in Poland and the Czech Republic, where they play on Šlágr TV.

Personnel 
Tomáš Kollár — fiddle
Štefan Kollár — saxophone, clarinet, accordion
Marek Kollár — second fiddle
Juraj Švedlár — contrabass
Martin Budinský — dulcimer
Juliús Michal Hudi — second dulcimer

Discography

Albums
 Z Kolačkova parobci
 Keď chlapci hrajú
 Hej tam od Tater
 Pozdrav zo Slovenska
 Dievčatá
 Vianoce s Kollárovcami
 Goraľu cy či ne žaľ

External links 
 
 Kollárovci po siedmykrát a stále originálni
 folklornet.com
 Kollárovci: Muzikanti z Kolačkova dobýjajú srdcia doma aj za hranicami

Slovak musical groups
Folk music groups
Musical groups established in 1997